In geometry, the grand 600-cell or grand polytetrahedron is a regular star 4-polytope with Schläfli symbol {3,3,5/2}. It is one of 10 regular Schläfli-Hess polytopes. It is the only one with 600 cells.

It is one of four regular star 4-polytopes discovered by Ludwig Schläfli. It is named by John Horton Conway, extending the naming system by Arthur Cayley for the Kepler-Poinsot solids.

The grand 600-cell can be seen as the four-dimensional analogue of the great icosahedron (which in turn is analogous to the pentagram); both of these are the only regular n-dimensional star polytopes which are derived by performing stellational operations on the pentagonal polytope which has simplectic faces. It can be constructed analogously to the pentagram, its two-dimensional analogue, via the extension of said (n-1)-D simplex faces of the core nD polytope (tetrahedra for the grand 600-cell, equilateral triangles for the great icosahedron, and line segments for the pentagram) until the figure regains regular faces.

The Grand 600-cell is also dual to the great grand stellated 120-cell, mirroring the great icosahedron's duality with the great stellated dodecahedron (which in turn is also analogous to the pentagram); all of these are the final stellations of the n-dimensional "dodecahedral-type" pentagonal polytope.

Related polytopes 

It has the same edge arrangement as the great stellated 120-cell, and grand stellated 120-cell, and same face arrangement as the great icosahedral 120-cell.

See also 
 List of regular polytopes
 Convex regular 4-polytope
 Kepler-Poinsot solids - regular star polyhedron
 Star polygon - regular star polygons

References 
 Edmund Hess, (1883) Einleitung in die Lehre von der Kugelteilung mit besonderer Berücksichtigung ihrer Anwendung auf die Theorie der Gleichflächigen und der gleicheckigen Polyeder .
H. S. M. Coxeter, Regular Polytopes, 3rd. ed., Dover Publications, 1973. .
 John H. Conway, Heidi Burgiel, Chaim Goodman-Strass, The Symmetries of Things 2008,  (Chapter 26, Regular Star-polytopes, pp. 404–408)

External links 
 Regular polychora 
 Discussion on names
 Reguläre Polytope
 The Regular Star Polychora
 The Great 600-cell, a Zome Model 

4-polytopes